Anne Pingeot (born 13 May 1943 in Clermont-Ferrand, Puy-de-Dôme) is a French art historian specialising in French sculpture of the 19th century and author of several books and catalogues. She was curator at the department of sculpture at the Louvre and the Musée d'Orsay.

She was the mistress of François Mitterrand, the former President of the French Republic. Together they had a daughter, Mazarine Pingeot.

References

Bibliography 
2005: 
2008: La sculpture au XIXe : mélanges pour Anne Pingeot, collectif coordonné par Catherine Chevillot et Laure de Margerie, Éditions Nicolas Chaudun, 
2012: Mazarine Pingeot, Bon petit soldat, Paris, Julliard, 
2014: 
 François Mitterrand,
 Journal pour Anne : 1964–1970, Éditions Gallimard, coll. "Blanche", 2016, 496 p. 
 Lettres à Anne : 1962–1995, Gallimard, coll. "Blanche", 2016, 1280 p. 

1943 births
Living people
Writers from Clermont-Ferrand
French non-fiction writers
French women writers